"Prelude/Angry Young Man" is a song written by Billy Joel which appeared as the sixth song on the album Turnstiles in 1976. Live versions have been released as the second track of КОНЦЕРТ, the 11th track of the first disc of 2000 Years: The Millennium Concert, and the opening track on the first disc of 12 Gardens Live and Live at Shea Stadium: The Concert.  It is also included in the Broadway show Movin' Out.

The instrumental "Prelude" lasts approximately a minute and 43 seconds, starting with a rapid-fire hammered piano riff on the middle-C piano key, joined by various instruments, swinging through styles such an Aaron Copland-styled ballad to funk to a Southwestern beat. According to Joel in an interview with Howard Stern, the rhythm of the fast-paced piano riff was meant to pay homage to the drum part in the song "Wipe Out" by The Surfaris. When performing live, Joel plays the fast-paced prelude himself, but performs the song early in the setlist, largely because the prelude section was easiest to manage during the adrenaline moments of starting a show, as opposed to being attempted after he had already expended much of his energy for other songs.

It is then followed by "Angry Young Man", which paints a slightly sardonic picture of youthful, militant rebellion that is unflagging, trying to fight life's ills despite constant failure ("He refuses to bend, he refuses to crawl / And he's always at home with his back to the wall / And he's proud of his scars and the battles he's lost / And he struggles and bleeds as he hangs on his cross / And he likes to be known as the angry young man"). The song contrasts the angry youth's feelings with the maturity of the narrator, who could be interpreted as either the same angry youth at a later age, or somebody who once felt as the angry young man currently does ("I believe I've passed the age of consciousness and righteous rage / I found that just surviving was a noble fight / I once believed in causes too / I had my pointless point of view / And life went on no matter who was wrong or right".)

Despite never having been released as a single, "Prelude/Angry Young Man" has become a popular song among fans as well as a staple of live shows. "Prelude" was used as an opening theme for the German television talk show Live (1988-1996); and also used as theme song for Grampian Television's summertime news magazine programme "Summer at Six" in the early 1980s. It has also been frequently used during stoppages of play at New York Knicks home games in Madison Square Garden.

Rock Band 
It was made available to download on March 22, 2011, for use in the Rock Band 3 music gaming platform in both Basic rhythm, and PRO mode which utilizes real guitar/bass guitar, and MIDI compatible electronic drum kits/keyboards in addition to vocals.

References

1976 songs
Billy Joel songs
Songs written by Billy Joel